The Valur women's football team, commonly known as Valur, is the women's football department of the Valur multi-sport club. It is based in Reykjavík, Iceland, and currently plays in the Úrvalsdeild kvenna, the top-tier women's football league in Iceland. The team plays it home games at Hlíðarendi located in Reykjavík. The team's colors are red and white.

Valur has won the Icelandic championship 11 times and the Icelandic Women's Cup 13 times.

Recent history
In 2017, the team hired Pétur Pétursson as head coach. In September 2019, Valur won the national championship for the eleventh time in its history, and first time since 2010.

Titles
Icelandic Championships: 13
1978, 1986, 1988, 1989, 2004, 2006, 2007, 2008, 2009, 2010, 2019, 2021, 2022
Cup Champions: 13
1984, 1985, 1986, 1987, 1988, 1990, 1995, 2001, 2003, 2006, 2009, 2010, 2011
Super Cup Champions: 9
2004, 2005, 2007, 2008, 2009, 2010, 2011, 2018, 2019, 2022
Icelandic Women's League Cup: 5
2003, 2005, 2007, 2010, 2017

Current squad
 ''As of 4 July 2022

References

External links
Official website
Team Profile at ksi.is

Valur
Capital Region (Iceland)
Úrvalsdeild Women clubs
Valur (club)